The Western General Hospital (often abbreviated to simply ‘The Western General’) is a health facility at Craigleith, Edinburgh, Scotland. It is managed by NHS Lothian.

History
The hospital was designed by Peddie and Kinnear and opened as the St. Cuthberts and Canongate Poorhouse in 1868, principally as a workhouse but also having some hospital functions. It was later renamed Craigleith Poorhouse. In 1915, during the First World War, the building was requisitioned by the War Office to create the 2nd Scottish General Hospital, a facility for the Royal Army Medical Corps to treat military casualties. After returning to poorhouse use in 1920 it was converted fully to hospital use in 1927. A nurses' home was added in 1935 and a pathology block was completed in 1939. It joined the National Health Service in 1948 and a new library was completed in 1979.

The first Maggie's Cancer Caring Centre opened on the Western General Hospital site in 1996.

In June 2012 the Medicine for the Elderly services were transferred from the Royal Victoria Hospital to a new purpose-built facility known as the Royal Victoria Building at the Western General Hospital.

A facility to treat young people with cancer aged 16 to 24 was opened in the Western General Hospital in December 2013.

Buildings
Buildings include:
Nuffield Transplant Unit by Peter Womersley, 1955 – distinctive modernist architecture and pedestrian bridge over the south access road
A range of functional buildings from the 1950s (including surgical theatres) by Basil Spence
Nurses Home by City Architect (Ebenezer MacRae) 1935
Pathology Department by City Architect (Ebenezer MacRae) 1939
Royal Victoria Building. The RVB was built primarily as a replacement for the Royal Victoria Hospital, a Medicine of the Older Adult assessment and rehabilitation Unit.

Services
The hospital has over 700 beds including day beds. Although the Western no longer has an Accident and Emergency department, a nurse-led minor injuries unit has been operating on the site since 1994.

The hospital served as a base for the neurology and neurosurgery centre for south east Scotland ("Department of Clinical Neurosciences")  until the department moved to the Edinburgh Royal Infirmary at Little France in 2020.

There is a major national cancer research and treatment centre at the hospital which was refurbished in 2007.

References

External links 
 
 Western General Hospital Official site

NHS Scotland hospitals
Teaching hospitals in Scotland
Hospitals in Edinburgh
1868 establishments in Scotland
Hospitals established in 1868
University of Edinburgh
NHS Lothian